USS McKee (DD-87) was a  built for the United States Navy during World War I.

Description
The Wickes class was an improved and faster version of the preceding . Two different designs were prepared to the same specification that mainly differed in the turbines and boilers used. The ships built to the Bethlehem Steel design, built in the Fore River and Union Iron Works shipyards, mostly used Yarrow boilers that deteriorated badly during service and were mostly scrapped during the 1930s. They had a crew of 6 officers and 108 enlisted men.

Performance differed radically between the ships of the class, often due to poor workmanship. The Wickes class was powered by two steam turbines, each driving one propeller shaft, using steam provided by four water-tube boilers.

The ships were armed with four 4-inch (102 mm) guns in single mounts and were fitted with two  1-pounder guns for anti-aircraft defense. Their primary weapon, though, was their torpedo battery of a dozen 21 inch (533 mm) torpedo tubes in four triple mounts. In many ships a shortage of 1-pounders caused them to be replaced by 3-inch (76 mm) anti-aircraft (AA) guns. 
They also carried a pair of depth charge rails. A "Y-gun" depth charge thrower was added to many ships.

Construction and career
McKee, the second ship named for Hugh W. McKee, was laid down 29 October 1917 by Union Iron Works, San Francisco, California, launched 23 March 1918, sponsored by Mrs. J. Tynan, and commissioned 7 September 1918, Lieutenant Commander W. H. Lee in command. Following a west coast shakedown, McKee sailed from Mare Island 13 September 1918, transited the Panama Canal the 27th, and reported for duty with Destroyer Flotilla 5 at New York 2 October. In this late phase of World War I, short coastal sailings preceded her departure from Hampton Roads 28 October as a convoy escort. Upon her arrival in the Azores 5 November she was assigned to a returning convoy and entered New York Harbor 2 December. Early in 1919 she steamed to Guantanamo Bay, Cuba, for fleet exercises from 26 January to 4 April. A number of voyages from Key West, Florida, to Halifax, Nova Scotia, kept her crew well trained prior to her reporting Portsmouth, New Hampshire, 13 December to be placed in reduced commission.

From July 1921, McKee based first at Newport, Rhode Island, then at Charleston, South Carolina, and in the aftermath of the Washington Disarmament Conference proceeded to Philadelphia in April 1922. Decommissioning 16 June 1922, she was struck from the Navy list 7 January 1936 and sold to Boston Iron & Metal Company, Inc., Baltimore, Maryland, for scrapping.

Notes

References

External links
NavSource Photos

 

Wickes-class destroyers
World War I destroyers of the United States
Ships built in San Francisco
1918 ships